Everardo is a Spanish male given name. It is cognates with the English name Everard, and is ultimately derived from the Old Germanic name Eberhard.

Notable people with this name include:

 Everardo Cristóbal (born 1986), Mexican sprint canoeist
 Everardo Elizondo, Mexican economist
 Everardo Múzquiz (born 1911), Mexican sprinter
 Everardo Villarreal Salinas (born 1978), Mexican politician
 Everardo Zapata Santillana (born 1926), Peruvian teacher and author of Coquito
 Francisco Everardo Oliveira Silva (born 1965), best known by his stage name Tiririca, Brazilian actor
 José Everardo Nava (born 1961), Mexican politician
 Juan Everardo Nithard (1607–1681), Austrian priest

As surname
 Milton Castellanos Everardo (1920–2011), Mexican politician and lawyer